John Drew Jr. (November 13, 1853 – July 9, 1927), commonly known as John Drew during his life, was an American stage actor noted for his roles in Shakespearean comedy, society drama, and light comedies. He was the eldest son of John Drew Sr., who had given up a blossoming career in whaling for acting, and Louisa Lane Drew, and the brother of Louisa Drew, Georgiana Drew, and Sidney Drew. As such, he was also the uncle of John, Ethel, and Lionel Barrymore, and also great-great-uncle to Drew Barrymore. He was considered to be the leading matinee idol of his day, but unlike most matinee idols Drew's acting ability was largely undisputed.

Life
Drew was educated at a fine academy in Philadelphia, but the life of the theater would become his primary focus at a young age. His first role as a boy was "Plumper" in Cool as a Cucumber at the family's Arch Street Theater.

Drew had a long association with Charles Frohman and leading lady Maude Adams. In these years under Frohman, John Drew's stardom was established. His first play with Frohman was The Masked Ball, a comedy adapted from a French play. This show was primarily a vehicle to establish Drew's stardom under Frohman, and it succeeded in that.

Drew was associated originally with the company of Augustin Daly in the 1880s, a man known for managing and training with grim efficiency. Under Daly's management, John Drew developed his reputation for versatility, appearing in many varieties of play, but especially in contemporary works that are rarely performed or remembered today. His frequent leading lady with Daly was Ada Rehan. His memoirs, titled My Years on the Stage, were published in 1922. His final Broadway play was The Circle co-starring fellow veteran star Mrs. Leslie Carter and proved to be a popular comeback for the two Victorian actors. The Circle was made into a silent film in 1925 by MGM directed by Frank Borzage.

Highly esteemed by his fellow actors, John Drew was elected lifetime president of New York City’s theatrical club The Players. The appellation "Jr.", distinguishing him from his long-deceased actor father, is usually dropped. He died in San Francisco on July 9, 1927 shortly after being visited by his nephews John and Lionel Barrymore, both of whom had taken time off from movie-making on the West Coast. After cremation, his remains were taken to Philadelphia and interred at Mount Vernon Cemetery alongside his wife.

Drew and his wife Josephine (nee Baker) had one daughter, Louise Drew (1882–1954). Louise married Broadway actor Jack Devereaux and they had a son, John Drew Devereaux.

See also
 Barrymore family

References

External links

 Britannica Student Encyclopedia entry on John Drew (Jr.)
 John Drew photo gallery at NYP Library
 
John Drew Jr. : North American Theatre Online

1853 births
1927 deaths
American male stage actors
John Drew Jr.
Members of The Lambs Club
Burials at Mount Vernon Cemetery (Philadelphia)